Syed Muhammad Ali Shah Bacha is a Pakistani politician who had been a Member of the Provincial Assembly of Khyber Pakhtunkhwa, from 2002 to May 2018.

Political career
He was elected to the Provincial Assembly of the North-West Frontier Province as a candidate of Pakistan Peoples Party (PPP) from Constituency PF-98 (Malakand Protected Area-I) in 2002 Pakistani general election. He received 9,926 votes and defeated a candidate of Muttahida Majlis-e-Amal.

He was re-elected to the Provincial Assembly of the North-West Frontier Province as a candidate of PPP from Constituency PF-98 (Malakand Protected Area-I) in 2008 Pakistani general election. He received 17,654 votes and defeated a candidate of Awami National Party.

He was re-elected to the Provincial Assembly of Khyber Pakhtunkhwa as a candidate of PPP from Constituency PK-98 (Malakand Protected Area-I) in 2013 Pakistani general election. He received 16,150 votes and defeated a candidate of Pakistan Tehreek-e-Insaf.

His video of giving bribe for buying votes of MPAs in Senate Election 2018 surfaced on 9th Feb, 2021 just before a month of new senate elections. 20 MPAs was bribed by PPP for winning senate seat. Total bribe of about PKR 800 Million (USD 7.2 Million) was given to 20 MPAs.

List as follows: 1. Deena Naaz 2. Nargis Ali 3. Nagina Khan 4. Sardar Idrees 5. Obaid Mayar 6. Zahid Durrani 7. Fouzia Bibi 8. Naseem Hayat 9. Qurban Khan 10. Arif Yousaf 11. Amjid Afridi 12. Abdul Haq 13. Javed Naseem 14. Yasin Khalil 15. Faisal Zaman 16. Sami Alizayi 17. Meraj Hamayun 18. Khatoon Bibi 19. Babar Saleem 20. Wajihuz Zaman

References

Living people
Khyber Pakhtunkhwa MPAs 2013–2018
Pakistan People's Party politicians
North-West Frontier Province MPAs 2002–2007
Khyber Pakhtunkhwa MPAs 2008–2013
Year of birth missing (living people)